David Helbock (born 28 January 1984 in Koblach) is an Austrian jazz musician.

Music education 
Helbock began playing piano at the age of six. After several years of lessons at the music school Feldkirch with Nora Calvo Smith and at the jazz seminar Dornbirn with Paul Winter, he switched to the music high school in Feldkirch in 1998.
During school he began to study piano with Ferenc Bognar at the Vorarlberg State Conservatory, where he completed his classical concert diploma in 2005.

Since 2000, Helbock has also taken lessons with the New York jazz pianist Peter Madsen, with whom he also played in the band Mistura and in his ensemble CIA (Collective of Improvising Artists).

Activities 
With his different musical projects, like the "David Helbock Trio", "David Helbock's Random/Control" and also as a solo artist, Helbock toured all over the planet.

In 2014, Helbock appeared as a soloist on Michael Mantler's CD The Jazzcomposers Orchestra - Update, released by ECM Records. He also plays on Mantler's albums Comment c'est (2017) and Coda (2021).

Since 2010 till 2015 Helbock's CDs as a leader were published on the label Traumton in Berlin.
Since 2016 Helbock is an exclusive artist with the record company ACT Music from Munich. Up to date Helbock released five albums on ACT - "Into the Mystic" (2016 with the David Helbock Trio), "Tour d´Horizon" (2018 with Random/Control), "Playing John Williams" (2019 - Solopiano), "The New Cool" (2021 with Arne Jansen & Sebastian Studnitzky) and "Playground" (2022 with french singer Camille Bertault).

In 2010 he released his "Personal Realbook", a compositional project, where he wrote one tune every day for a whole year, inspired by the Brazilian jazz legend Hermeto Pascoal.
Hermeto also contributed a song to Helbock's CD "Think of Two" in 2014.

Awards 

Helbock is a prizewinner at the world-biggest Jazzpianosolo Competition in Montreux 2007 and 2010 and in addition also won the audience prize. In 2011 he was awarded the Outstanding Artist Award of the government of Austria.

Selected discography 

 1998: Happiness (Solo)
 2003: Emotions (Solopiano)
 2004: Transformation (David Helbock Trio)
 2006: Celebrating modern Genius (HDV Trio)
 2007: Time (Solopiano)
 2008: Suite of Philosophical Sounds - SUN RA (with Peter Madsen's CIA)
 2008: All In (HDV Trio)
 2010: My Personal Realbook (Sheet Music)
 2010: Thousand Miles Journey (with Peter Madsen's CIA)
 2010: David Helbock's Random/Control
 2011: Diagonal (Frick/Helbock Duo)
 2012: Purple (Solopiano)
 2014: Think of Two (Random/Control)
 2014: What's Next? I Don't Know! (Raab/Helbock Duo)
 2014: The Jazzcomposers Orchestra – Update (with Michael Mantler)
 2015: Mistura (with Peter Madsen)
 2015: Aural Colors (David Helbock Trio)
 2016: Into the Mystic (David Helbock Trio)
 2016: Comment Cést (with Michael Mantler)
 2018: Tour d´Horizon (Random/Control)
 2019: Playing John Williams (Solopiano)
 2021: Coda Orchestra Suites (with Michael Mantler)
 2021: The New Cool (with Arne Jansen & Sebastian Studnitzky)
 2022: Playground (with Camille Bertault)

References

External links 
 Homepage of David Helbock
 Infopage (AllAboutJazz)

1984 births
Living people
Austrian jazz pianists
Austrian jazz composers
Male jazz composers
Male pianists
21st-century pianists
21st-century male musicians